Kenneth L. Farquharson known professionally as Ken Parker (born c. 1948 in Darliston, Westmoreland Parish, Jamaica) is a Jamaican musician who first recorded in the 1960s.

Biography
Like many of Jamaica's singers of the era, Parker began by singing in church, where his father was a preacher. He formed a group called the Blues Benders in the mid-1960s, and their first recording was "Honeymoon by the Sea". The group arranged to audition for Coxsone Dodd, but due to a misunderstanding, Parker was the only member to turn up, so he auditioned as a soloist, impressing Dodd sufficiently to launch his solo career. While at Studio One, he recorded singles such as "Choking Kind", "Run Come", and "My Whole World is Falling Down", and an album, Keep Your Eyes on Jesus, followed in 1968. He moved on to work with Duke Reid, who produced hits including "Jimmy Brown", "Help Me Make it Through the Night", and "Kiss an Angel Good Morning". His popularity continued to grow and he recorded for other producers including Bunny Lee ("Guilty"), Rupie Edwards ("Talk About Love"), Byron Lee ("Will the Circle be Unbroken"), Lloyd Charmers ("Queen Majesty"), and Joe Gibbs ("Only Yesterday"). 

By 1972, however, Parker had become disillusioned with the recording industry and ceased recording, relocating to England in 1973 after spending two years in New York City. He continued to perform occasionally but did not return to recording until the early 1980s, setting up his own record label and production company, releasing gospel records. He later moved to Florida. In April 2014, he performed to a sold out show at the International Ska and Reggae Festival in London.

Discography

Albums
Keep Your Eyes on Jesus (1968) Studio One/Tabernacle
Jimmy Brown (1974) Trojan
Here Comes Ken Parker (1974)
A Touch of Inspiration (1984) Pisces
I Shall Not Be Moved (1984) Pisces
Jesus on the Main Line (1985) Pisces
The Key (1990) Body Music

Compilation albums
A Glint of Gold (1986) Pisces
The Best of: Groovin' in Style! (2003) Trojan

References

External links
Ken Parker at Roots Archives
Peter I (2004) "Sacred Songs: an interview with Ken Parker", Reggae Vibes

Living people
Jamaican reggae musicians
Island Records artists
People from Westmoreland Parish
Year of birth missing (living people)